Mauro Geraldo Galvão (born 19 December 1961) is a Brazilian retired footballer who played as a sweeper, having won the title of Brazilian Champion four times, playing for Internacional (1979), Grêmio Portoalegrense (1996) and Vasco da Gama (1997 and 2000), along a span of 21 years; won the Libertadores Cup in 1998 and lost the finals of the 1999 Intercontinental Cup and of the 2000 FIFA Club World Championship.

Playing career
In his country Galvão played for Sport Club Internacional, Bangu Atlético Clube, Botafogo de Futebol e Regatas, Grêmio Foot-Ball Porto Alegrense (two spells) and CR Vasco da Gama. In 1990–91 he moved to FC Lugano in Switzerland, where he would remain for the following six seasons, winning the 1993 Swiss Cup after having reached the final of the competition the previous year.

After contributing rarely to Grêmio's fifth place in the 2001 Série A, also winning his second Brazilian Cup – the first was also conquered with that club, four years before – Galvão retired from football, at the age of 40.

He gained 24 caps for Brazil, his debut coming in 1986. After being an unused squad member at that year's FIFA World Cup, he was a starter under Sebastião Lazaroni in the 1990 FIFA World Cup in Italy, partnering Ricardo Gomes, Carlos Mozer and Ricardo Rocha – all four stoppers saw time during the tournament, Galvão played all four games, three complete – in a 5–3–2 formation, in an eventual round-of-16 exit.

Additionally Galvão helped the national team win the 1989 Copa América, also appearing in all the matches at the 1984 Summer Olympics tournament, which ended with silver medal conquest.

Managerial career
In 2003 Galvão replaced Antônio Lopes as Vasco's head coach, starting his coaching career. He managed the club in 28 games, finally preventing its relegation to the Série B, after finishing 17th. The following year he was appointed at Botafogo taking Levir Culpi's place, but was himself fired before the end of the season.

In 2005 Galvão briefly managed Clube Náutico Capibaribe, coaching Vila Nova Futebol Clube in the same year.

References

External links
 

1961 births
Living people
Footballers from Porto Alegre
Brazilian footballers
Association football defenders
Campeonato Brasileiro Série A players
Sport Club Internacional players
Bangu Atlético Clube players
Botafogo de Futebol e Regatas players
Grêmio Foot-Ball Porto Alegrense players
CR Vasco da Gama players
Swiss Super League players
FC Lugano players
Brazil international footballers
1986 FIFA World Cup players
1989 Copa América players
1990 FIFA World Cup players
Copa América-winning players
Footballers at the 1984 Summer Olympics
Olympic footballers of Brazil
Olympic silver medalists for Brazil
Olympic medalists in football
Brazil under-20 international footballers
Brazilian expatriate footballers
Expatriate footballers in Switzerland
Brazilian football managers
CR Vasco da Gama managers
Botafogo de Futebol e Regatas managers
Clube Náutico Capibaribe managers
Vila Nova Futebol Clube managers
Medalists at the 1984 Summer Olympics